The 1925 Cincinnati Reds season was a season in American baseball. The team finished third in the National League with a record of 80–73, 15 games behind the Pittsburgh Pirates.

Off-season 
The Reds suffered a devastating loss during the off-season, as late in the 1924 season, first baseman Jake Daubert became ill and he underwent an appendectomy on October 2. Complications from the surgery arose, and Daubert died a week later on October 9. Daubert, who joined Cincinnati in 1919, appeared in 801 games with the Reds, batting .301 with 23 home runs and 307 RBI. In the 1919 World Series, Daubert batted .241 with four runs, a triple and an RBI, helping the club to the championship.

Late in spring training, the Reds lost outfielder George Burns and infielder Lew Fonseca to the Philadelphia Phillies on waivers.

Regular season 
Cincinnati had a hot start to the season, as they were tied with the New York Giants for first place with a record of 8-3 in their first 11 games. By the middle of May though, the club went through a lousy stretch of games, and fell into sixth place with a record of 11-14 after 25 games.

At the end of May, the Reds and Pittsburgh Pirates completed a trade, as Cincinnati sent pitcher Tom Sheehan to the Pirates for first baseman Al Niehaus. Niehaus, a 26 year old rookie who was born in Cincinnati, struggled in Pittsburgh, batting .219 with 7 RBI in 17 games.

At the beginning of June, the Reds had an excellent 11-1 stretch, pushing their record up to 30-24, and into third place in the National League, only three games behind the New York Giants for first place. The Reds followed up their hot streak with a bad 21 game slump, winning only five games, and quickly dropped to sixth place with a 35-40 record. During this time, the club picked up first baseman Walter Holke off of waivers from the Philadelphia Phillies. Holke was hitting .244 with a home run and 17 RBI with the Phillies at the time of the transaction.

The Reds continued to be a very streaky team, as they earned a record of 21-6 in their next 27 games, bringing them back into third place, bringing them back to 6.5 games behind the first place Pittsburgh Pirates.

Cincinnati could not keep pace with Pittsburgh though, as the Reds finished the season in third place with a record of 80-73, 15 games behind the pennant winning Pirates. This marked the Reds fourth consecutive season of finishing with a winning record, however, the 80 games won was the club's fewest since winning only 70 in 1921.

Outfielder Edd Roush had another spectacular season, as he led the club with a .339 batting average, eight home runs and 83 RBI. Roush finished in 10th place in National League MVP voting. Outfielder Curt Walker had a solid season, hitting .318 with six home runs and 71 RBI, while catcher Bubbles Hargrave batted .300 with two home runs and 33 RBI.

On the pitching staff, Pete Donohue led the club with a 21-14 record and a 3.08 ERA in a team high 301 innings pitched. Dolf Luque rebounded from a poor 1924 season, as despite a 16-18 record, he led the Reds with a 2.63 ERA, and had a team best 140 strikeouts, while tying for the National League lead with four shutouts. Eppa Rixey had a 21-11 record with 2.88 ERA in 287.1 innings pitched.

Season standings

Record vs. opponents

Roster

Player stats

Batting

Starters by position 
Note: Pos = Position; G = Games played; AB = At bats; H = Hits; Avg. = Batting average; HR = Home runs; RBI = Runs batted in

Other batters 
Note: G = Games played; AB = At bats; H = Hits; Avg. = Batting average; HR = Home runs; RBI = Runs batted in

Pitching

Starting pitchers 
Note: G = Games pitched; IP = Innings pitched; W = Wins; L = Losses; ERA = Earned run average; SO = Strikeouts

Other pitchers 
Note: G = Games pitched; IP = Innings pitched; W = Wins; L = Losses; ERA = Earned run average; SO = Strikeouts

Relief pitchers 
Note: G = Games pitched; W = Wins; L = Losses; SV = Saves; ERA = Earned run average; SO = Strikeouts

References 
1925 Cincinnati Reds season at Baseball Reference

Cincinnati Reds seasons
Cincinnati Reds season
Cincinnati Reds